The representative of the Government in the Senate is the member of the Senate of Canada who is responsible for introducing, promoting, and defending the government's bills in the Senate after they are passed by the House of Commons. The representative is appointed by the prime minister. 

The position replaced the leader of the Government in the Senate, which from 1867 to 2015 was a senator who was a member of the governing party and led the government caucus in the Senate of Canada (whether or not that party held a majority in the Senate). The position of Leader had almost always been held by a Cabinet minister, except briefly in 1926, from 1958 to 63 and from 2013 to the position being discontinued in 2015. 

The government representative's counterpart on the Opposition benches is the leader of the Opposition in the Senate, who continues to be a member of the Official Opposition political party.

Senator Marc Gold has served as the second and current representative of the Government in the Senate since January 24, 2020.

History

As Leader of the Government 
Early Canadian cabinets included several senators who would be answerable to the Senate for government actions, one of whom would serve as de facto government leader in the Senate. In the nineteenth century, it was not considered unusual for a senator to be Prime Minister. Sir John Joseph Caldwell Abbott and Sir Mackenzie Bowell served as prime minister from the Senate.  Abbott and Bowell both found it difficult to lead the government from the Senate, however, and over time, the perceived legitimacy of the Senate declined. Today, it is rare for senators to occupy prominent positions in cabinet. From 1935 on, it was typical for a cabinet to have only one senator who would have the position of minister without portfolio alongside the position of leader of the government in the Senate.

There have been a few rare occasions when the leader of the government in the Senate was not included in the cabinet by virtue of a separate ministerial appointment, such as William Benjamin Ross who served in the position in 1926, and Walter Morley Aseltine and Alfred Johnson Brooks who were not included in the cabinets of Prime Minister John Diefenbaker from 1958-1963. In 1968, the position of leader of the government in the Senate became an official Cabinet position in its own right with the appointment of Paul Martin, Sr. (father of Canada's future prime minister, Paul Martin). From July 2013, under Prime Minister Stephen Harper, the government leader in the Senate was again a non-cabinet minister.

Occasionally, senators still hold senior cabinet positions (other than the leader of the government in the Senate) in order to ensure regional balance in cabinet if the governing party is unable to elect members in a particular region or province, e.g., when the Progressive Conservative Party formed the government under the leadership of Joe Clark in 1979, and when the Liberal Party formed the government under the leadership of Pierre Trudeau in 1980. However, it is usually the case that the leader of the government in the Senate is the sole senator serving in Cabinet.

The responsibilities of the leader of the government in the Senate include:

 Planning and managing the government's legislative program in the Senate
 Answering all questions for the government during the Senate's Question Period
 Maintaining relations with the opposition on all matters concerning Senate activities
 Working with the leader of the Government in the House of Commons to ensure the effective coordination of the government's legislative programme.

The government side in the Senate is the party that forms the government in the House of Commons. This means that the government party in the Senate may have fewer seats than the opposition, particularly when a general election results in a new party forming government.

As Representative of the Government 
Due to current Prime Minister Justin Trudeau's 2014 decision to remove senators from the Liberal Party of Canada caucus, leaving them all effectively sitting as independent senators, Trudeau named a Representative of the Government in the Senate in the 42nd Canadian Parliament rather than a government leader. The situation created some uncertainty about how the Senate would function, and how government legislation would be brought to the Senate. Retired civil servant Peter Harder was named to the position on March 18, 2016.

On November 29, 2019, the Prime Minister's office announced that Senator Harder would be stepping down from his position as Representative of the Government in the Senate effective December 31, 2019. It was also announced that Senator Grant Mitchell would retire as Government Liaison in the Senate but would continue until a replacement for Harder was named in "due course." On January 24, 2020, Prime Minister Justin Trudeau announced that Senator Marc Gold had agreed to become the new Government Representative in the Senate, sitting as a non-affiliated senator and would also be sworn in as a Privy Councillor.

Office holders
Key:

See also
 Leader of the Opposition in the Senate (Canada)

Notes

References

External links
 Parliament of Canada biography of current Leader of the Government in the Senate

Canadian ministers
Westminster system
Senate of Canada